The following is a complete list of home video releases for the CBS television series NCIS: Los Angeles. The first five seasons have been released on DVD in Regions 1, 2, and 4, and Season 1 was released on Blu-ray Disc in Region A. The first season DVD release includes the introductory episodes that aired as part of the sixth season of NCIS, which were also included on the NCIS Season 6 DVD set. All releases are distributed by Paramount Home Entertainment through CBS Home Entertainment.

Box sets

DVD

Blu-ray Disc

DVD compilations

References

External links
 

Home video releases
NCIS: Los Angeles